Pennsylvania is a small village in South Gloucestershire, England. It is situated on the A46 near the historic cities of Bristol (to the west) and Bath (to the south).

Name origin

The second part of the name, 'sylvania', comes from the Latin word for 'woodland', silva. The first part of the name, 'penn', likely comes either from the British (Celtic) word pen, meaning 'hill', or a personal name.

See also
 Pennsylvania (disambiguation)

References

External links

Villages in South Gloucestershire District